Chen Lu (born 18 December 1997) is a Chinese badminton player. In 2016, she won the China International Challenge tournament in the mixed doubles event partnered with Wang Sijie, and in 2017, she became the runner-up in the women's doubles event partnered with Zhou Chaomin.

Achievements

BWF World Tour 
The BWF World Tour, announced on 19 March 2017 and implemented in 2018, is a series of elite badminton tournaments, sanctioned by Badminton World Federation (BWF). The BWF World Tour are divided into six levels, namely World Tour Finals, Super 1000, Super 750, Super 500, Super 300 (part of the HSBC World Tour), and the BWF Tour Super 100.

Mixed doubles

BWF International Challenge/Series 
Women's doubles

Mixed doubles

  BWF International Challenge tournament
  BWF International Series tournament

References

External links 
 

1997 births
Living people
Chinese female badminton players
Badminton players from Guangdong
21st-century Chinese women